Dairy Farmers may refer to various companies, brand names, co-operatives or trade unions:

 Dairy Farmers, Inc - United States
 Dairy Farmers Pty Ltd - Australia
 Dairy Farmers of America
 Dairy Farmers of Britain
 Dairy Farmers of Canada 
 Dairy Farmers of Ontario

See also
 Dairy farming 
 Dairy Farmers Stadium